Alex Lowe (1958–1999) was an American mountaineer.

Alex Lowe may also refer to:
 Alex Lowe (actor) (born 1968), English actor
 Alex Lowe (musician), singer/guitarist with Hurricane No. 1
 Alex Lowe (American Horror Story), a character in American Horror Story: Hotel